HMS Dolphin was the Dutch 7th Charter Dolfijn, launched in 1780 at Amsterdam. In 1781 she was under the command of Captain Mulder when she participated in the battle of Dogger Bank.

 and  captured her on 15 September 1799 off Vlie Island. The Royal Navy took her into service and commissioned her in November as the sixth-rate HMS Dolphin under the command of Lieutenant R. M'Dougall. She became a transport in 1800, and a storeship in 1802. She was broken up in 1803.

Notes

Citations

References
Clowes, W. Laird, et al. (1897-1903) The royal navy: a history from the earliest times to the present. (Boston: Little, Brown and Co.; London: S. Low, Marston and Co.)
 
 

1780 ships
Captured ships
Ships built in Amsterdam
Sixth rates of the Royal Navy